French Pakistani or Pakistani French may refer to:
France–Pakistan relations (c.f. "a French-Pakistani treaty")
Mixed race people of French and Pakistani descent
People with dual citizenship of France and Pakistan
Pakistanis in France
French people in Pakistan